Jamel Vaughn Morris (born November 14, 1992) is an American professional basketball player for Lietkabelis Panevėžys of the Lithuanian Basketball League and the EuroCup. He played college basketball in the United States for Fairmont State University.

College career

Glenville State 2011–2013 
Morris averaged 16 points per game as a freshman (401 total points) and was an All-Freshman Team selection. He averaged 20 points per game as a sophomore (560 total points) and was named to the all-conference team.

Fairmont State 2013–2016 
Morris was a two years starter after sitting out one year to redshirt. He led the team to two NCAA tournaments and made the third-most three-point field goals in a single season at Fairmont State (92). Ranked #2 in the country for 10 weeks and ranked top 5 for 16 straight weeks, finished the year as #8 at NABC poll. He was an All-Conference selection and set MEC record for threes in a game (11) along with season-high 37 points.

Professional career 
After his college career, he signed with Ste Mar. 90 Cestistica Civitavecchia (Serie C-Gold) in Italy.  He averaged 23 points per game, 8 rebounds per game, 4 assists per game and 1.2 steals per game. He earned MVP of the week twice. At the start of the 2017–18 season, Morris was signed by the Grand Rapids Drive, affiliate to the Detroit Pistons in the NBA G League.

Grand Rapids Drive
Morris averaged 25 minutes per game, 13 points per game and 2 assists per game while shooting 42% from the field and 40% from three. His team was the Central Division Runner-up and clinched a playoff berth for the first time in their history.

NBA Summer League
In the summer of 2018, Morris played for the Detroit Pistons in the NBA Summer League in Las Vegas, Nevada.

Split
On August 15, 2018, he signed for Croatian team Split. He left Split in January 2019. Before the beginning of 2019-20 season, he re-signed with Split. During his time in Split in 2018-2019 he averaged 15 points per game in Croatian League competition and 13 points per game in ABA League competition while shooting 51% from the field and 52% from three. In the 2019-2020 in 19 minutes per game he averaged 10 points and 4 assists while shooting 42% from the field and 42% from three, helping lead the team to the second spot in the standings and the final four playoff spot for first time.

Legia Warszawa
On July 24, 2020, Morris signed with Legia Warszawa of the Polish Basketball League.

Orléans Loiret Basket
On April, 2020, Morris signed with Orléans Loiret Basket of the LNB Pro A.

Mitteldeutscher BC
On July 19, 2021, he has signed with Brose Bamberg of the Basketball Bundesliga (BBL). However, the team opted to replace him with a point guard during the preseason. On September 11, Morris signed with Mitteldeutscher BC.

Lietkabelis Panevėžys 
On July 10, 2022, he signed with Lietkabelis Panevėžys of the Lithuanian Basketball League and the EuroCup.

References

External links 
NBA G League profile
Jamel Morris at Eurobasket
Fairmont State Fighting Falcons bio

1992 births
Living people
American expatriate basketball people in Croatia
American expatriate basketball people in France
American expatriate basketball people in Italy
American expatriate basketball people in Poland
American men's basketball players
Basketball players from Ohio
Fairmont State Fighting Falcons men's basketball players
Glenville State Pioneers basketball players
Grand Rapids Drive players
KK Split players
Legia Warsaw (basketball) players
Mitteldeutscher BC players
Shooting guards